Telecommunications Act may refer to:

 Telecommunications Act 1997, Australia
 Telecommunications Act (Canada)
 Telecommunications Act 1950, Malaysia
 Telecommunications Act 1984, United Kingdom - superseded by Communications Act 2003
 Telecommunications Act of 1996, United States
 Telecommunications Act 2001, New Zealand